Robert Brazier may refer to:

 Robert Boyd Brazier (1916–1942), U.S. Navy sailor
 USS Robert Brazier, a 1944 John C. Butler-class destroyer escort
 Robert H. B. Brazier (died 1837), English surveyor